Officer's Quarters may refer to:

Officers Quarters, Washington Navy Yard, listed on the National Register of Historic Places in Washington, D.C.
Officer's Quarters (Tucson, Arizona), listed on the National Register of Historic Places in Pima County, Arizona
Officer's Quarters (Fort Gibson, Oklahoma), listed on the National Register of Historic Places in Muskogee County, Oklahoma